The following outline is provided as an overview of and topical guide to Marxism:

Marxism – method of socioeconomic analysis that analyzes class relations and societal conflict using a materialist interpretation of historical development and a dialectical view of social transformation. It originates from some of the work of or all of the work of the mid-to-late 19th century works of German philosophers Karl Marx and Friedrich Engels.

According to Marxist perspective, class conflicts conditions the evolution of modes of production, such as the development of slavery to feudalism to capitalism, and as such, the contradictions of capitalism demands the organization of the proletariat to establish a communist society through revolution and maintenance of the dictatorship of the proletariat. Marxism has since developed into different branches and schools of thought, and there is now no single definitive Marxist theory.

History of Marxism 
 History of communism
 Marxist historiography
 Revisionism
 Anti-revisionism

Marxist fields of study

Marxian critique of political economy 

 Mode of production
 Primitive communism
 Asiatic mode of production
 Feudal mode of production
 Capitalist mode of production
 Socialist mode of production
 Means of production
 Relations of production
 Exploitation of labour
 Factors of production
 Subject of labor
 Means of labor
 Labour power
 Capital
 Rate of profit
 Capital accumulation
 Organic composition of capital
 Constant capital
 Variable capital
 Surplus value
 Surplus labour
 Surplus product
 Law of value
 Commodity
Value form
 Use value
 Exchange value

Marxist sociology 

 Social class / Marxian class theory
 Bourgeoisie
 Petite bourgeoisie
 Proletariat
 Peasantry
 Lumpenproletariat
 False consciousness
 Class consciousness
 Class struggle
 Alienation
 Base and superstructure
 Social metabolism
 Metabolic rift

Marxist philosophy 

 Dialectical materialism
 Philosophy in the Soviet Union

Marxist schools of thought 

Classical Marxism
 De Leonism
 Orthodox Marxism
 Luxemburgism
 Leninism
 Marxism–Leninism (see also Stalinism)
 Titoism
 Hoxhaism
 Juche
 Maoism
 Socialism with Chinese characteristics
 Deng Xiaoping Theory
 Xi Jinping Thought
 Marxism–Leninism–Maoism
 Marxism–Leninism–Maoism–Prachanda Path
 Bordigism
 Trotskyism
 Council communism
 Eurocommunism

Persons influential in Marxism 

Marx and Engels influences

Marxist theorists

Other persons

 Marxists by nationality
 Anti-Revisionists
 Marxian economists
 Marxist historians
 Eric Hobsbawm
 Marxist writers

Marxist bibliography

Works by Karl Marx and Friedrich Engels 

 Marx and Engels

 The Holy Family (1844)
 The German Ideology (1846)
 The Communist Manifesto (1848)
 Revolution and Counter-Revolution in Germany (1851–1852)
 The Civil War in the United States (1861–1862)

 Marx

 The Eighteenth Brumaire of Louis Napoleon (1852)
 Grundrisse (1857–1858)
 A Contribution to the Critique of Political Economy (1859)
 Theses on Feuerbach (1888)
 Das Kapital
 Das Kapital, Volume I (1867)
 Das Kapital, Volume II (1885)
 Das Kapital, Volume III (1894)

 Engels

 Anti-Dühring (1878)
 The Origin of the Family, Private Property and the State (1884)

Works by Karl Kautsky 

 The Class Struggle (Erfurt Program) (1892)
 Forerunners of Modern Socialism (1895)
 The Dictatorship of the Proletariat (Kautsky) (1918)

Works by Vladimir Lenin 

 What Is to Be Done? (1902)
 The State and Revolution (1917)
 Imperialism, the Highest Stage of Capitalism (1917)
 The Tasks of the Proletariat in the Present Revolution (The April Theses, 1917)
 "Left-Wing" Communism: An Infantile Disorder (1929)

Works by Joseph Stalin 

 Marxism and the National Question (1913)

Works by Leon Trotsky 

 The Permanent Revolution (1930)
 The Revolution Betrayed (1937)

Works by Mao Zedong 

 On Guerrilla Warfare (1937)
 On Practice (1937)
 On Contradiction (1937)
 On Protracted War (1938)

Other influential works 

 History and Class Consciousness (György Lukács, 1923)
 Prison Notebooks (Antonio Gramsci, 1929–1935)
 Ideology and Ideological State Apparatuses (Louis Althusser, 1970)

Marxist academic journals 

 New Left Review
 Capital & Class
 Radical Philosophy
 Rethinking Marxism
 Historical Materialism

Marxist organizations

Early organizations 
 League of the Just
 Communist League

International Marxist organizations 
 Communist International
 Committee for a Workers' International
 International Communist Party

United States 
 All-African People's Revolutionary Party
 American Labor Party
 American Workers Party
 Black Panther Party
 Communist Party (Marxist–Leninist) (United States)
 Communist Party USA
 Freedom Socialist Party
 Internationalist Workers Party (Fourth International)
 Party for Socialism and Liberation
 Red Guard Party
 Revolutionary Communist Party, USA
 Socialist Action (United States)
 Socialist Alternative (United States)
 Socialist Equality Party (United States)
 World Socialist Party of the United States
 Workers Party (United States)
 Workers Party of the United States
 Workingmen's Party of the United States

See also 

 Outline of socialism
 Outline of economics
 Outline of political science

References

External links 

 Marxists Internet Archive (MIA)
 Marxmail.org
 Marx Myths & Legends
 Marxism Page
 History of Economic Thought: Marxian School
 History of Economic Thought: Neo Marxian
 London Philosophy Study Guide on Marxism (offers many suggestions on what to read, depending on student's familiarity with the subject)

Marxism
Marxism